The 2014 Portsmouth City Council elections took place on Thursday 22 May 2014 to elect members of Portsmouth City Council in Hampshire, England. One third of the council's seats were contested using the first-past-the-post voting system, alongside elections to the European Parliament. The ruling Liberal Democrat group lost control of the council to No overall control, with UKIP making 6 gains to win their first seats on the Council.

After the election, the composition of the council was:
Liberal Democrats - 18 (-5)
Conservatives - 12 (0)
UKIP - 6 (+6)
Labour - 4 (-1)

Following the elections, a Conservative minority administration was formed, replacing the previous Liberal Democrat majority that had governed Portsmouth since 2009. This administration was formed with the support of Labour and UKIP

Election result

Ward results
Comparisons for the purpose of determining a gain, hold or loss of a seat, and for all percentage changes, is to the last time these specific seats were up for election in 2010.

 - Hancock share compared to his performance under Liberal Democrat label in 2010.

References

Portsmouth City Council - Statement of Persons Nominated
Portsmouth City Council - Election Results Front Page

2014
2014 English local elections
2010s in Hampshire